Banksia biterax is a species of dense shrub that is endemic to Western Australia. It has hairy stems, deeply serrated leaves and spikes of up to 200 pale to dark brown flowers.

Description
The leaves are serrated to the midvein, with 60 to 110 triangular lobes and are woolly-hairy on the lower surface.

Taxonomy and naming
This species was first described in 1830 by Robert Brown in the supplement to his Prodromus Florae Novae Hollandiae et Insulae Van Diemen and was given the name Dryandra baxteri. In 2007 Austin Mast and Kevin Thiele transferred all the dryandras to the genus Banksia but as there was already a plant named Banksia baxteri, Mast and Thiele chose the specific epithet "biterax", an anagram of baxteri.

Distribution and habitat
Banksia biterax grows in kwongan and eucalyptus woodland near Busselton and between the Stirling Range and Albany.

References

 

biterax
Plants described in 1830
Endemic flora of Western Australia
Eudicots of Western Australia
Taxa named by Kevin Thiele